Javinan (also Romanized as Javīnān and Jovīnān; also known as Jebinūn and Jovītān) is a village in Qohrud Rural District, Qamsar District, Kashan County, Isfahan Province, Iran. At the 2006 census, its population was 215, in 81 families.

References 

Populated places in Kashan County